Mexico competed at the 2018 Winter Olympics in Pyeongchang, South Korea, from 9 to 25 February 2018, with four competitors in three sports.

German Madrazo was the country's flag bearer during the opening ceremony.

Competitors
The following is the list of number of competitors participating in the Mexican delegation per sport.

Alpine skiing 

Mexico qualified one male and one female athlete for alpine skiing events.

Cross-country skiing 

Mexico qualified one male athlete, signifying the nation's return to the sport for the first time since 1992.

Distance

Freestyle skiing 

Slopestyle

References

Nations at the 2018 Winter Olympics
2018
2018 in Mexican sports